John Ward (June 11, 1923 – March 23, 1995) was an American actor.

Ward was born in Los Angeles, California and was best known for such films and television series as PT 109, Baretta and The FBI.

Partial filmography
Space Master X-7 (1958) - (uncredited)
Gunsmoke in Tucson (1958) - Slick Kirby
Who Was That Lady? (1960) - Gibson (uncredited)
PT 109 (1963) - Radioman John Maguire
Valley of the Dolls (1967) - Neely O'Hara's Psychiatrist (uncredited)

References/Notes

External links

1923 births
1995 deaths
American male film actors
American male television actors
Male actors from Los Angeles
20th-century American male actors